Parliamentary assembly may refer to:
National Parliament, a type of state legislative assembly body 
Assembly of national parliaments, an inter-parliamentary institution of state national legislatures
International parliament, a supranational legislative body of intergovernmental organization
The Parliamentary Assembly of the Council of Europe

See also
 Franco-German Parliamentary Assembly

sv:Parlamentarikerförsamling